Alphonse-Marie-Denis de Vismes (or Devismes), called Saint-Alphonse, (1746 in Paris – 18 May 1792, id.) was an 18th-century French playwright and librettist.

Biography 
The brother of writer and musicographer Jacques de Vismes du Valgay, Saint-Alphonse  was an artillery officer before becoming cabinet reader of Prince of Condé and general director of the farms.

Making literature his leisure, he was a member of the Académie de Dijon. He gave the Académie royale de musique Les Trois Âges de l’Opéra, music by Grétry (1778), revised in Amadis de Gaule, an opera by Quinault on a music by Johann Christian Bach (1779), L’Heureuse Réconciliation (1785), Rosanie (1780) and Eugénie et Linval, ou le Mauvais Fils (1798).

Sources 
 Ferdinand Hoefer, « Alphonse-Marie-Denis de Vismes », Nouvelle Biographie générale, t. 46, Paris, Firmin-Didot, 1866, (p. 301).

External links 
 Alphonse de Vismes on data.bnf.fr
 His plays and their présentations on "CÉSAR"

18th-century French dramatists and playwrights
French opera librettists
1746 births
Writers from Paris
1792 deaths